Naomi Russell (born 1990), is an Australian gymnast.

Naomi Russell may also refer to:

 Naomi Ryan (born 1977), a British actress born as Naomi Russell
Naomi Russell, character in Lie to Me played by Tricia Helfer
 Naomi Russell (born 1983), an American pornographic actress, winner of an AVN Award in 2007